The 1981 Lifesaving World Championships were conducted between 1–3 May 1981 at Kuta Beach on the island of Bali in Indonesia. They were held under the auspices of World Lifesaving (WLS), one of the two precursor organisations to the International Life Saving Federation (ILS).  15 Ocean and Beach events were held purely for competitors representing their club teams. Some 47 club teams participated from 5 countries including Australia, Hong Kong, Indonesia, New Zealand, and the United Kingdom.

Results

References

Surf lifesaving
Lifesaving
Sport in Bali
Lifesaving competitions